RCAF Station Jericho Beach, originally known as the Jericho Beach Air Station, was one of the first Canadian air stations opened by the Canadian Air Board. Jericho Beach is located in Vancouver, British Columbia.

History
Jericho Beach began operation in 1920 as a flying boat station, one of several that would open along the British Columbia coast.  Federal and provincial government departments used the aircraft based here for civil roles such as anti-smuggling, fishery, and forestry patrols, and transportation to remote communities. Some of the aircraft used at Jericho Beach since 1920 included the Curtiss HS-2L, Canadian Vickers Vancouver, Canadian Vickers Vedette, and Stranraer.

The Royal Canadian Air Force (RCAF) took over Jericho Beach in 1924, and the station was renamed "RCAF Station Jericho Beach." No. 4 and No. 6 Bomber Reconnaissance Squadrons, and No. 1 Signal Squadron began operating from the station. In 1930, the RCAF used Jericho Beach as their centre for seaplane and flying boat training. By 1940, the seaplane squadrons had moved to RCAF Station Sea Island, and No. 3 Operational Training Unit (OTU) began operations, training aircrew on flying boats. No. 3 Repair Depot was also established in 1940, and along with No. 3 OTU, would remain until 1945. 

In 1942 the army's Pacific Command Headquarters moved to Jericho Beach, and in 1947, the army took control of the station. There remained, however, a small RCAF presence. Over the years, the station hosted many other army and Canadian Forces units. Most of the base facilities were transferred to the City of Vancouver in 1969, and the area renamed "Jericho Park."

Jericho Beach detachment was closed in 1996. Most of the base's buildings, including the old flying boat hangars, have been taken down. The few that remain and are being used for non-military purposes.

See also
Jericho Beach

References

Citations

Bibliography
Milberry, L., ed. (1984). Sixty Years—The RCAF and CF Air Command 1924–1984. Toronto: Canav Books. .
 Weicht, C. (1997). Jericho Beach and the West Coast Flying Boat Stations. MCW Enterprises.

External links
 Jericho Beach Garrison
 Film of Vickers Vedette operating from Jericho
 Film of an RCAF Fairchild FC-2 operating from Jericho in 1928

Jericho Beach